Frederik Kalbermatten (born 25 May 1981) is a Swiss snowboarder. He competed in the men's halfpipe event at the 2006 Winter Olympics.

References

External links
 

1981 births
Living people
Swiss male snowboarders
Olympic snowboarders of Switzerland
Snowboarders at the 2006 Winter Olympics
Sportspeople from Valais
21st-century Swiss people